The second season of the American competitive reality television series MasterChef Junior premiered on Fox on November 4, 2014 and concluded on December 16, 2014.

The winner was Logan Guleff, an 11-year-old from Memphis, Tennessee, with 12-year-old Samuel Stromberg from Greenbrae, California  being the runner-up.

Top 16

Elimination table

 (WINNER) This cook won the competition.
 (RUNNER-UP) This cook finished in second place.
 (WIN) The cook won an individual challenge (Mystery Box Challenge or Elimination Test).
 (WIN) The cook was on the winning team in the Team Challenge and directly advanced to the next round.
 (HIGH) The cook was one of the top entries in an individual challenge, but did not win.
 (IN) The cook was not selected as a top or bottom entry in an individual challenge.
 (IN) The cook was not selected as a top or bottom entry in a Team Challenge
 (IMM) The cook did not have to compete in that round of the competition and was safe from elimination.
 (IMM) The cook was selected by the Mystery Box Challenge winner and didn't have to compete in the Elimination Test.
 (LOW) The cook was one of the bottom entries in an individual challenge, and advanced.
 (LOW) The cook was one of the bottom entries in the Team Challenge, and advanced.
 (ELIM) The cook was eliminated.

Episodes

References

2014 American television seasons
Season 2